Donald Stone may refer to:
Don Stone (publisher), DJ, publisher and businessman
Donnie Stone (born 1937), American football player
Donald Stone (cricketer) (born 1927), English cricketer